UC-45 may refer to:

 , a World War I German coastal minelaying submarine
 Beechcraft Model 18, an airplane with a United States military designation of "UC-45"